Betty Petryna or Doreen Allen (November 26, 1930 – September 4, 2020) played in the All-American Girls Professional Baseball League. She both threw and batted right-handed.

Professional baseball career
Betty was described as "a rock-solid player at third base." She had never even played that position, but was told by the teacher in the first game that she had to play in third base.  After that she said she wanted second as it was a closer throw but was told she had to be third as she was 'good and could throw the ball to first." She played for both the Fort Wayne Daisies (1949), Grand Rapids Chicks (1948). In her first year she earned $75 a week and in her second, $125.

Betty also got an AAGPBL all-time record of 12 assists in one game. She made a solid contribution to her team in its 1948 win of the Eastern Division Championship.

Born in Regina, Saskatchewan, Canada, Betty retired from playing professional baseball in  1950. She just missed her husband too much so she quit.

Career statistics
Seasonal batting record

References

All-American Girls Professional Baseball League players
American baseball players
1930 births
2020 deaths
Baseball people from Saskatchewan
Canadian baseball players
Sportspeople from Regina, Saskatchewan
Baseball third basemen
21st-century American women